First Methodist Episcopal Church is a historic church at 24 N. Fullerton Avenue in Montclair, Essex County, New Jersey, United States.

It was built in 1902 and added to the National Register of Historic Places in 1988.

See also 
 National Register of Historic Places listings in Essex County, New Jersey

References

Methodist churches in New Jersey
Churches on the National Register of Historic Places in New Jersey
Gothic Revival church buildings in New Jersey
Churches completed in 1902
20th-century Methodist church buildings in the United States
Churches in Essex County, New Jersey
Montclair, New Jersey
National Register of Historic Places in Essex County, New Jersey
New Jersey Register of Historic Places